Dalysford is a rural locality in the Bundaberg Region, Queensland, Australia.

History 
Dalysford Provisional opened circa 1892. On 1 January 1909, it became Dalysford State School. It closed temporarily between late 1924 to circa April 1925 due to low student numbers. It closed permanently in 1927. It was located to the south-west of Dalysford railway station, off the Dalysford Road (approx ), just across the locality boundary into present-day Moolboolaman.

Education 
There are no schools in Dalysford. The nearest government primary schools are Gin Gin State School in Gin Gin to the north-east and Wallaville State School in Wallaville to the south-east. The nearest government secondary school is Gin Gin State High School in Gin Gin.

References

Further reading 

 

Bundaberg Region
Localities in Queensland